This is a complete list of all of New Zealand's national cricket captains at official international level. As such it includes details of all the men who have captained at least one Test match or One Day International, all boys who have captained in at least one Youth Test or Youth ODI, and all women who have captained at least one women's Test match or women's one-day international. New Zealand became a full member of the Imperial Cricket Conference (now the International Cricket Council) on 31 May 1926 at the same time as India were made up to full membership, and their first-class cricket matches against other full member nations since that date have been Tests.

Men's cricket

Test match captains
This is a list of cricketers who have captained the New Zealand national cricket team for at least one Test match. Where a player has a dagger (†) next to a Test match series in which he captained at least one Test, that denotes that player deputised for the appointed captain or was appointed for a minor proportion in a series.

The table of results is complete up to the second Test against England in February 2023.

Note:
 1 Jeff Crowe and Martin Crowe are brothers.

Men's One-Day International captains
This is a list of cricketers who have captained the New Zealand national cricket team for at least one One Day International.

Twenty20 International captains

This is a list of cricketers who have captained the New Zealand national cricket team for at least one Twenty20 International.

Women's cricket

Test match captains

This is a list of cricketers who have captained the New Zealand women's cricket team for at least one women's Test match.

Women's One-Day International captains

This is a list of cricketers who have captained the New Zealand women's cricket team for at least one women's one-day international. New Zealand's greatest ODI success was under Emily Drumm when they won the 2000/1 World Cup.

Women's Twenty20 International captains

This is a list of cricketers who have captained the New Zealand women's cricket team for at least one Twenty20 International match.

Youth cricket

Test match captains

This is a list of cricketers who have captained the New Zealand Under-19 cricket team for at least one under-19 Test match. Where a player has a dagger (†) next to a Test match series in which he captained at least one Test, that denotes that player was captain for a minor proportion in a series.

Youth One-Day International captains

This is a list of cricketers who have captained the New Zealand Under-19 cricket team for at least one Under-19 One Day International.

See also
New Zealand national cricket team

Notes

References

 
 
 
 
 
 

National
New Zealand

Captains